Oecobius cellariorum is a species of wall spider in the family Oecobiidae. It is found in a range from Southern Europe to North Africa, Jordan and Iran, has been introduced into the United States, China, and Japan.

References

Oecobiidae
Articles created by Qbugbot
Spiders described in 1836